Yorn is a surname. Notable people with the surname include:

Julie Yorn (born 1967), American film producer
Kevin Yorn (born 1965), American lawyer
Pete Yorn (born 1974), American singer, songwriter, and musician

See also
Corn (surname)